Beryllium fluoride is the inorganic compound with the formula BeF2. This white solid is the principal precursor for the manufacture of beryllium metal.  Its structure resembles that of quartz, but BeF2 is highly soluble in water.

Properties
Beryllium fluoride has distinctive optical properties. In the form of fluoroberyllate glass it has the lowest refractive index for a solid at room temperature of 1.275.  Its dispersive power is the lowest for a solid at 0.0093, and the nonlinear coefficient is also the lowest at 2 × 10−14.

Structure and bonding

The structure of solid BeF2 resembles that of cristobalite.  Be2+ centers are four coordinate and tetrahedral and the fluoride centers are two-coordinate.  The Be-F bond lengths are about 1.54 Å. Analogous to SiO2, BeF2 can also adopt a number of related structures. An analogy also exists between BeF2 and AlF3: both adopt extended structures at mild temperature.

Gas and liquid BeF2
Gaseous beryllium fluoride adopts a linear structure, with a Be-F distance of 143 pm. BeF2 reaches a vapor pressure of 10 Pa at 686 °C, 100 Pa at 767 °C, 1 kPa at 869 °C, 10 kPa at 999 °C, and 100 kPa at 1172 °C.

'Molecules' of liquid beryllium fluoride have a fluctuating tetrahedral structure. Additionally, the density of liquid BeF2 decreases near its freezing point, as Be2+ and F− ions begin to coordinate more strongly with one another, leading to the expansion of voids between formula units.

Production
The processing of beryllium ores generates impure Be(OH)2.  This material reacts with ammonium bifluoride to give ammonium tetrafluoroberyllate:
Be(OH)2  +  2 (NH4)HF2   →   (NH4)2BeF4  +  2 H2O
Tetrafluoroberyllate is a robust ion, which allows its purification by precipitation of various impurities as their hydroxides.  Heating purified (NH4)2BeF4 gives the desired product:
(NH4)2BeF4   →  2 NH3  +  2 HF  +  BeF2

In general the reactivity of BeF2 ions with fluoride are quite analogous to the reactions of SiO2 with oxides.

Applications
Reduction of BeF2 at 1300 °C with magnesium in a graphite crucible provides the most practical route to metallic beryllium:

BeF2 + Mg → Be + MgF2
The chloride is not a useful precursor because of its volatility.

Niche uses
Beryllium fluoride is used in biochemistry, particularly protein crystallography as a mimic of phosphate.  Thus, ADP and beryllium fluoride together tend to bind to ATP sites and inhibit protein action, making it possible to crystallise proteins in the bound state.

Beryllium fluoride forms a basic constituent of the preferred fluoride salt mixture used in liquid-fluoride nuclear reactors. Typically beryllium fluoride is mixed with lithium fluoride to form a base solvent (FLiBe), into which fluorides of uranium and thorium are introduced. Beryllium fluoride is exceptionally chemically stable, and LiF/BeF2 mixtures (FLiBe) have low melting points (360–459 °C) and the best neutronic properties of fluoride salt combinations appropriate for reactor use. MSRE used two different mixtures in the two cooling circuits.

Safety

Beryllium compounds are highly toxic. The increased toxicity of beryllium in the presence of fluoride has been noted as early as 1949.  The  in mice is about 100 mg/kg by ingestion and 1.8 mg/kg by intravenous injection.

References

External links
 IARC Monograph "Beryllium and Beryllium Compounds"
 National Pollutant Inventory: Beryllium and compounds fact sheet
 National Pollutant Inventory: Fluoride and compounds fact sheet
 Hazards of Beryllium fluoride
 MSDS from which the LD50 figures

Beryllium compounds
Fluorides
Alkaline earth metal halides